Selhurst railway station is in the London Borough of Croydon in south London,  along the line from . It is operated by Southern, which also provides all the train services. The station is in Travelcard Zone 4.

History 

The Balham Hill and East Croydon line was constructed by the London, Brighton and South Coast Railway (LB&SCR) as a short-cut on the Brighton Main Line to London Victoria, avoiding Crystal Palace and Norwood Junction. It was opened on 1 December 1862. However, Selhurst station was not opened until 1 May 1865.

The lines were quadrupled in 1903. In 1912, the lines were electrified via Norwood Junction to provide access for the carriage sheds and repair depot for the LB&SCR railway electrification scheme. In 1925, the lines from Victoria via Norbury were electrified.

Services 

All services at Selhurst are operated by Southern using  EMUs.

The typical off-peak service in trains per hour is:
 2 tph to  via 
 2 tph to 
 1 tph to  via 
 3 tph to 
 2 tph to 

At very early morning and late at night, trains will start/terminate here from Selhurst Depot.

Some additional fast services from London Victoria and East Croydon occasionally stop at platforms 3 & 4 during football events or engineering works.

Electronic ticket barriers were installed at the station in spring 2010.

Connections 
London Buses routes 75 and 157 serve the station.

Selhurst Railway Depot 

Selhurst Depot is located to the east of Selhurst station, and occupies a triangle of land bordered on one side by the Victoria lines and on another by the London Bridge lines. It was built on the site of the former Croydon Common Athletic Ground, where Crystal Palace F.C. played Football League matches between 1920 and 1924.

The depot is operated by the Southern train operating company, and units serviced there include classes 171, 377, 455, 313, 387 plus numerous departmental units and a Class 09 shunter.

Within the main office building is located Selhurst traincrew depot, where many drivers and conductors are based. The depot has extensive stabling sidings, the three main groups of which are known as: Chalk, AC (which were so named because that was where the trains of the former AC system were stabled) and North. There is a large maintenance shed, an AC test rig (for dual voltage units equipped with pantographs), a train wash plant, and a cleaning shed. At the north-east corner of the site, near Norwood Junction station, is the smaller Norwood drivers' depot, and beside it the diesel fuelling point. Selhurst is unusual in that the maximum speed within the depot is 15 mph rather than the usual 5 mph, and signalled train movements are permissive.

References

Platforms 
Platform 1 is used for Southbound trains towards East Croydon, Caterham, West Croydon, Sutton and Epsom Downs as well as terminating trains. It is long enough for 10 coaches.

Platform 2 is used for Northbound trains towards London Victoria, London Bridge, and Milton Keynes Central. This platform is also used for trains coming out of the depot going towards the mentioned stations. It is long enough for 10 coaches.

Platform 3 is used for non-stopping Brighton Main Line trains to pass through. It is separated from Platform 2 by fences in the middle, and is opened whenever a train occasionally does stop here. This usually occurs at 5am when 2 trains are timetabled to stop, as well as special events happening at Crystal Palace Football Ground 10 minutes away. It is long enough for 8 coaches.

Platform 4 is used for non-stopping Brighton Main Line trains bound for London Victoria to pass through. It is blocked off by a barricade in the subway that connects Platform 1 and 2 and is opened once again when there are special events or when a train is timetabled to stop. It is long enough for 8 coaches.

External links 

Railway stations in the London Borough of Croydon
Former London, Brighton and South Coast Railway stations
Railway stations in Great Britain opened in 1865
Railway stations served by Govia Thameslink Railway